Edward Stewart "Porky" Oliver, Jr. (September 6, 1915 – September 21, 1961) was a professional golfer from the United States. He played on what is now known as the PGA Tour in the 1940s and 1950s.

Career
Born in Wilmington, Delaware, Oliver started as a caddie at age 11 at the Dupont Country Club. He was later recruited to Wilmington Country Club where he led his team to the Philadelphia caddie championship title. He turned pro at the age of 19. As a youth his friends called him "Snowball" due to his accuracy throwing snowballs. He was an excellent all-around athlete and led his high school baseball team to a championship while averaging 14 strikeouts a game. After joining the golf circuit Oliver put on weight and eventually picked up the nickname "Porky."  He said the name came courtesy of his friend Sam Snead. At  his weight ranged from 215 to  during his career.

Oliver won eight times on the PGA Tour in the 1940s and 1950s. He was well known for finishing second in several major championships, but not letting it get him down. He lost to Ben Hogan in the finals of the 1946 PGA Championship, was runner-up to Julius Boros in the 1952 U.S. Open, and to Hogan at the 1953 Masters. He seemed to have a knack of playing his best golf against the greatest players. He defeated Ben Hogan in San Francisco and Phoenix in 1940 and at the 1941 Western Open. He defeated Hogan again in late 1945 at the Durham Jaycee Open but suffered high profile losses to him in later years. Not long after expressing his concern over playing with Hogan in the 1951 Colonial National Invitation Tournament, which ended badly for him, he faced him in the final group at the 1952 U.S. Open. It turned out to be one of Oliver's greatest performances as he came from five behind golf's leading man over the final 36 holes in the Texas heat. Unfortunately he could not overcome the lead of Julius Boros who took the title, while Oliver finished second.

Oliver had a couple big wins against Byron Nelson including their 36 hole quarterfinal match in the 1946 PGA after which Nelson went into retirement. He also defeated Sam Snead to win the 1956 White Sulfur Springs Open. When South African Bobby Locke dominated the US tour in 1947, he defeated Oliver in a playoff at the All American Open and passed him for the win at the Canadian Open after Oliver broke the tournament scoring record. They finished in a tie for third at the 1946 US Open. Before being sidelined with cancer Oliver collected 145 top ten finishes, including 22 seconds and 17 thirds.

In 1940 Oliver finished in a tie with Lawson Little and Gene Sarazen at the 1940 U.S. Open, but in a highly controversial decision was disqualified for teeing off 30 minutes early over weather concerns (under current rules, tournament directors reserve the rule to advance round start times, group players in three, and using both the first and tenth tees in case of approaching weather). Bobby Jones called it, "the most unfortunate golfing occasion of which I have ever heard." Later that same year, Oliver played a series of exhibitions with Gene Sarazen sponsored by Golf Magazine. He was the medalist in the stroke play qualifier of the PGA Championship in 1954, but lost in the third round to eventual champion Chick Harbert. Because of his positive attitude, Oliver was a popular player on tour. Ken Venturi called him, "the greatest ambassador to golf who ever played."

Oliver played on three Ryder Cup teams (1947, 1951, and 1953). In the 1953 matches at Wentworth, England, he teamed with his boyhood friend Dave Douglas (the only other golfer from Delaware to win on the PGA Tour) to defeat Peter Allis and Harry Weetman. That single point would prove the margin of victory for the US team. Oliver lost four and a half years during his prime (age 25 - 30) while serving in the U.S. Army during World War II. He was also involved in several serious car accidents, including one that took the life of a fellow passenger when they were returning from the Tucson Open. The driver was Oliver's friend and 1952 PGA champion, Jim Turnesa. On the way to the LA Open in 1949 his car was rear-ended by a lumber truck in Oregon. He suffered from the after effects of his injuries for much of the balance of his career. To spend more time with his family and gain a regular paycheck, he held head professional positions at Hornell, New York, Kenmore, Washington, and Canton, Massachusetts. These positions also greatly restricted his time on the tour.

Cancer
Two weeks after finishing ninth in the 1960 Houston Open, Oliver was diagnosed with cancer and had part of a lung removed in late May in Denver. Remarkably, he played a tour event that September in Utah, but missed the cut by two strokes. Oliver was an advocate for cancer research, traveling the banquet circuit while battling the disease. Numerous golf tournaments and fundraisers were held in his honor. Presidents Kennedy and Eisenhower, Bob Hope, Bing Crosby, Ed Sullivan and many more joined a national committee to raise funds for his family and to fight cancer. In August 1961 the PGA named him the "Honorary Captain" of that year's Ryder Cup Team. He died in September at age 46 at Memorial Hospital in Wilmington, Delaware, less than a month before the matches.

Legacy
In 1976, Oliver was inducted into the Delaware Sports Museum and Hall of Fame in its inaugural year. The course of the Wilmington Country Club where he caddied as a teenager has been redesigned and is now the Ed Oliver Golf Club. During the 2022 BMW Championship in Wilmington, Delaware Oliver was inducted by the Western Golf Association into the Caddie Hall of Fame. He and his wife Clara (1915–2010) are buried in All Saints Cemetery in Wilmington; they had three sons and a daughter.

Professional wins

PGA Tour wins (8)
1940 (3) Bing Crosby Pro-Am, Phoenix Open, St. Paul Open
1941 (1) Western Open
1947 (1) San Antonio Texas Open
1948 (1) Tacoma Open Invitational
1953 (1) Kansas City Open
1958 (1) Houston Open

Other wins
this list may be incomplete
1936 Central Pennsylvania Open
1937 Wood Memorial
1938 South Jersey Open, Central Pennsylvania Open
1939 Buffalo Open
1940 Buffalo Open
1940 Mid-South Better-Ball Championship (partnered with Clayton Heafner)
1945 Delaware Open
1948 Pacific Northwest PGA Championship
1949 Northwest Open, Philippine World Open, Washington State PGA Championship, Idaho Open, Esmeralda Open, Goodwill Open
1954 Wood Memorial
1956 Massachusetts Open, White Sulphur Open
1959 Jamaica Open, Montana Open, Lake Tahoe Pro-Am

Results in major championships

Note: Oliver never played in The Open Championship.

NT = no tournament
DQ = disqualified
CUT = missed the half-way cut
R64, R32, R16, QF, SF = Round in which player lost in PGA Championship match play
"T" indicates a tie for a place

Summary

Most consecutive cuts made – 12 (1948 PGA – 1955 Masters)
Longest streak of top-10s – 5 (1946 U.S. Open – 1947 PGA)

U.S. national team appearances
Ryder Cup: 1947 (winners), 1951 (winners), 1953 (winners)
Lakes International Cup: 1952 (winners)
Hopkins Trophy: 1953 (winners), 1954 (winners)

See also
List of golfers with most PGA Tour wins

References

External links
Ed Oliver Golf Club
Delaware Sports Museum and Hall of Fame
Caddie Hall of Fame

American male golfers
PGA Tour golfers
Ryder Cup competitors for the United States
Golfers from Delaware
United States Army personnel of World War II
Sportspeople from Wilmington, Delaware
1915 births
1961 deaths